Tracey Lambrechs (born 27 August 1985) is a former New Zealand weightlifter who competed in the +75 kg division. She won a bronze medal at the 2014 Commonwealth Games and a silver at the 2015 Pacific Games. She placed 13th at the 2016 Olympics.

Lambrechs was born in South Africa and moved to New Zealand with her family in 1999. She played netball in the New Zealand national league, and competed internationally in athletics. She took up weightlifting aged 17. She was selected as flag bearer for New Zealand at the opening ceremony of the 2015 Pacific Games.

Lambrechs announced her retirement at the 2018 Gold Coast Commonwealth Games.

Major results

References

External links

1985 births
Living people
New Zealand female weightlifters
Commonwealth Games bronze medallists for New Zealand
Weightlifters at the 2014 Commonwealth Games
South African emigrants to New Zealand
Weightlifters at the 2016 Summer Olympics
Olympic weightlifters of New Zealand
Commonwealth Games medallists in weightlifting
Weightlifters at the 2018 Commonwealth Games
Sportspeople from Johannesburg
20th-century New Zealand women
21st-century New Zealand women
Medallists at the 2014 Commonwealth Games